Sentul Timur LRT station is an elevated light rapid transit (LRT) station and serves as the terminal station for the Ampang Line and Sri Petaling Line. The station is located in Sentul, a suburb of Kuala Lumpur, which is surrounded by medium density low cost housing developments. Pangsapuri Melur is the nearest residential property to this station.

Sentul is a main town area in Kuala Lumpur. It is divided into two sections namely Sentul Barat (West Sentul) and Sentul Timur (East Sentul). Jalan Sentul and Jalan Ipoh are the two major roads servicing this area.

Although not designated as an official interchange, commuters may walk up to the  Sentul Komuter station on the Seremban Line from Sentul Timur station. It takes approximately 15 – 20 minutes for the walking distance.

History

The station is served by Ampang Line and Sri Petaling Line. Opened in 1998 as part of the lines' second phase of development of the former STAR LRT system, the station was intended to connect Sentul Timur to other parts of the city and surrounding areas.
Under Phase 2, a 15 km track with 11 stations was built to serve the northern and southern areas of Kuala Lumpur to cater for the Commonwealth Village and National Sports Complex in Bukit Jalil, during the KL Commonwealth Games in 1998.

Incidents

On 27 October 2006, a six-coach Adtranz LRT train which came in from Ampang overshot the end of the elevated tracks at the end of this station, resulting in the front half of the first coach dangling in the air about 25 m above the ground. A lone driver was the only one on board when the incident took place. Only Sentul Timur endured service disruption for 20 minutes that day.

Station layout

The station is a typical elevated Ampang Line and Sri Petaling station, the platform level is on the topmost floor, consisting of two sheltered side platforms along a double tracked line; there is a single concourse housing ticketing facilities between the ground level and the platform level. The design is similar to that of most other stations on the line, with multi-tiered roofs supported by latticed frames, and white plastered walls and pillars. All levels are linked by stairways and escalators.

References

Ampang Line
Railway stations opened in 1998
1998 establishments in Malaysia